Rohini is a series of satellites launched by the Indian Space Research organization  (ISRO). The Rohini series consisted of four satellites, each of which was launched by the Satellite Launch Vehicle (SLV) and three of which made it successfully to orbit. The series were mostly experimental satellites.

Satellites in series

Rohini Technology Payload (RTP)
It was a  experimental spin stabilized satellite that used 3W of power and was launched on 10 August 1979 from SDSC. The satellite contained instruments to monitor the launch vehicle. It did not achieve its intended orbit as the carrier rocket SLV was only 'partially successful'.

RS-1
It was the first satellite successfully launched by the indigenous launch vehicle SLV. It provided data on the fourth stage of SLV. The satellite had mission life of 1.2 years and an orbital life of 20 months.
     .

RS-D1
It was a  experimental spin stabilized satellite that used 16W of power and was launched on 31 May 1981. The launch of the SLV was a partial success as the satellite did not reach the intended height and thus it only stayed in orbit for 9 days. The satellite carried a solid state camera for remote sensing applications (Landmark Tracker) and performed to specifications.

RS-D2
The satellite was in operation (mission life) for 17 months and its main payload, a smart sensor camera, took over 2500 pictures. The camera had the capability to take pictures both in visible and infrared bands. After an orbital life of 7 years, the satellite reentered the Earth atmosphere on 19 April 1990.

See also

 List of Indian satellites

References

External links

Space programme of India
Satellites formerly orbiting Earth
Satellites of India